= Emelieana =

Scientific classification
- Domain: Eukaryota
- Kingdom: Animalia
- Phylum: Arthropoda
- Class: Insecta
- Order: Lepidoptera
- Superfamily: Noctuoidea
- Family: Erebidae
- Subfamily: Arctiinae
- Tribe: Lithosiini
- Genus: Emelieana de Vos & van Mastrigt, 2007
- Species: E. aureolineata

Binomial name
- Emelieana aureolineata de Vos & van Mastrigt, 2007

Genus of moths

Emelieana is a genus of moths in the family Erebidae. It contains only one species, Emelieana aureolineata, which is found in Papua.
